Narek (in Armenian Նարեկ), an Armenian given name, alternatively Nareg in Western Armenian. It may refer to:

People 
St. Gregory of Narek, knowns also as Grigor Narekatsi (951–1003), Armenian monk, poet, philosopher, theologian, Doctor of the church
Narek, the name commonly given to the "Book of Lamentations" by Gregory of Narek
Narek Beglaryan (born 1985), Armenian football (soccer) player
Narek Hakhnazaryan (born 1988), Armenian cellist 
Narek Sargsyan (born in 1959), Armenian politician
Narek Seferjan (born 1974), Russian-Armenian chess grandmaster, journalist and script writer

Places
Narek, Ararat, a village in Ararat province, Armenia
Nareg Schools, a series of Armenian Cypriot schools
Nicosia Armenian school 
Larnaca Armenian school 
Limassol Armenian school
Narekavank, a tenth-century Armenian monastery in present-day Yemişlik, Turkey

See also
Narekan or Nukeh, a village in Howmeh Rural District, Semnan Province, Iran